The 1995 Tulane Green Wave football team was an American football team that represented Tulane University during the 1995 NCAA Division I-A football season as an independent. In their fourth year under head coach Buddy Teevens, the team compiled a 2–9 record.

Schedule

References

Tulane
Tulane Green Wave football seasons
Tulane Green Wave football